Fassoudébé is a rural commune and village in the Cercle of Diéma in the Kayes Region of western Mali. The commune contains 3 villages and 3 hamlets. In the 2009 census the commune had a population of 5,120.

References

Communes of Kayes Region